Camilo Leandro Estévez Puga de Maside (died 1999) was a bishop of the Palmarian Catholic Church.  He was ordained a Roman Catholic Priest in Galicia, Spain and consecrated a bishop for the then Carmelite Order of the Holy Face on January 11, 1976 at El Palmar de Troya, Spain by Roman Catholic Archbishop Ngo Dinh Thuc Pierre Martin.

References

Bishops of Independent Catholic denominations
Spanish bishops
1999 deaths
Year of birth missing